A grass mountain in topography is a mountain covered with low vegetation, typically in the Alps and often steep-sided. The nature of such cover, which often grows particularly well on sedimentary rock, will reflect local conditions.

Distribution 
The following mountain ranges of the Eastern Alps in Europe are often referred to as grass mountains (Grasberge):

 the Allgäu Alps in Bavaria, Germany and Tyrol in Austria,
 the Kitzbühel Alps in the Austrian states of Salzburg and Tyrol, and
 the Dienten Mountains in Salzburg.

Other areas where grass mountains occur include: the gorges of the Himalayas, Scotland, Poland's Tatra Mountains, and Lofoten.

Individual examples 

 Geißstein (2,366 m), Kitzbühel Alps.
 Höfats (2,259 m), Allgäu Alps
 Schneck (2,268 m), Allgäu Alps
 Latschur (2,236 m), Gailtal Alps

Ascent techniques 
Negotiating the steep grass-covered sides of grass mountains requires a special type of climbing known as grass climbing (Grasklettern).

References 

Biogeomorphology
Mountain geomorphology